Nilo Silvan (born October 2, 1973) is a former American football wide receiver. He played for the Tampa Bay Buccaneers in 1996.

References

1973 births
Living people
American football wide receivers
Tennessee Volunteers football players
Tampa Bay Buccaneers players